Uttara-kuru may refer to:

 Uttarakuru, a continent in ancient Hindu and Buddhist mythology
 Uttarakuru Kingdom, a medieval kingdom to the north of India
 Uttara-kuru (band), a Japanese pop band